Nancy Cartwright (born October 25, 1957) is an American actress. She is the long-time voice of Bart Simpson on the animated television series The Simpsons, for which she has received a Primetime Emmy Award for Outstanding Voice-Over Performance and an Annie Award for Best Voice Acting in the Field of Animation. Cartwright also voices other characters for the show, including Nelson Muntz, Ralph Wiggum, Todd Flanders, Kearney, Database, and Maggie.

Cartwright was born in Dayton, Ohio. She moved to Hollywood in 1978 and trained alongside voice actor Daws Butler. Her first professional role was voicing Gloria in the animated series Richie Rich, which she followed with a starring role in the television movie Marian Rose White (1982) and her first feature film, Twilight Zone: The Movie (1983). In 1987, Cartwright auditioned for a role in a series of animated shorts about a dysfunctional family that was to appear on The Tracey Ullman Show. Cartwright intended to audition for the role of Lisa Simpson, the middle child; when she arrived at the audition, she found the role of Bart—Lisa's brother—to be more interesting. Matt Groening, the series' creator, allowed her to audition for Bart and offered her the role on the spot. She voiced Bart for three seasons on The Tracey Ullman Show, and in 1989, the shorts were spun off into a half-hour show called The Simpsons.

Besides The Simpsons, Cartwright has also voiced numerous other animated characters, including Daffney Gillfin in Snorks, Rufus in Kim Possible, Mindy in Animaniacs, Pistol in Goof Troop, the Robots in Crashbox, Margo Sherman in The Critic, Todd Daring in The Replacements, and Charles "Chuckie" Finster in Rugrats and All Grown Up! (a role she assumed in 2002, following the retirement of Christine Cavanaugh). In 2000, she published her autobiography, My Life as a 10-Year-Old Boy, and four years later, adapted it into a one-woman play. In 2017, she wrote and produced the film In Search of Fellini.

Early life
Cartwright was born in Dayton, Ohio, Frank and Miriam Cartwright's fourth of six children. She grew up in Kettering, Ohio, and discovered her talent for voices at an early age. While in the fourth grade at the school of St. Charles Borromeo, she won a school-wide speech competition with her performance of Rudyard Kipling's How the Camel Got His Hump. Cartwright attended Fairmont West High School, and participated in the school's theater and marching band. She regularly entered public speaking competitions, placing first in the "Humorous Interpretation" category at the National District Tournament two years running. The judges often suggested to her that she should perform cartoon voices. Cartwright graduated from high school in 1976 and accepted a scholarship from Ohio University. She continued to compete in public speaking competitions; during her sophomore year, she placed fifth in the National Speech Tournament's exposition category with her speech "The Art of Animation".

In 1976, Cartwright landed a part-time job doing voice-overs for commercials on WING radio in Dayton. A representative from Warner Bros. Records visited WING and later sent Cartwright a list of contacts in the animation industry. One of these was Daws Butler, known for voicing characters such as Huckleberry Hound, Snagglepuss, Elroy Jetson, Spike the Bulldog, and Yogi Bear. Cartwright called him and left a message in a Cockney accent on his answering machine. Butler immediately called her back and agreed to be her mentor. He mailed her a script and instructed her to send him a tape recording of herself reading it. Once he received the tape, Butler critiqued it and sent her notes. For the next year, they continued in this way, completing a new script every few weeks. Cartwright described Butler as "absolutely amazing, always encouraging, always polite".

Cartwright returned to Ohio University for her sophomore year, but transferred to the University of California, Los Angeles (UCLA) so she could be closer to Hollywood and Butler. Her mother, Miriam, died late in the summer of 1978. Cartwright nearly changed her relocation plans but, on September 17, 1978, "joylessly" left for Westwood, Los Angeles.

Career

Early career

While attending UCLA, which did not have a public speaking team, Cartwright continued training as a voice actress with Butler. She recalled, "every Sunday I'd take a 20-minute bus ride to his house in Beverly Hills for a one-hour lesson and be there for four hours ... They had four sons, they didn't have a daughter and I kind of fitted in as the baby of the family." Butler introduced her to many of the voice actors and directors at Hanna-Barbera. After she met the director Gordon Hunt, he asked her to audition for a recurring role as Gloria in Richie Rich. She received the part, and later worked with Hunt on several other projects. At the end of 1980, Cartwright signed with a talent agency and landed a lead role in a pilot for a sitcom called In Trouble. Cartwright described the show as "forgettable, but it jump-started my on-camera career". She graduated from UCLA in 1981 with a degree in theater. During the summer, Cartwright worked with Jonathan Winters as part of an improvisation troupe at Kenyon College in Gambier, Ohio.

Returning to Los Angeles, Cartwright won the lead role in the television movie Marian Rose White. Janet Maslin, a critic for The New York Times, described Cartwright as "a chubby, lumbering, slightly cross-eyed actress whose naturalness adds greatly to the film's impact". Cartwright replied by sending Maslin a letter insisting she was not cross-eyed, and included a photograph. Later, Cartwright auditioned for the role of Ethel, a girl who becomes trapped in a cartoon world in the third segment of Twilight Zone: The Movie. She met with director Joe Dante and later described him as "a total cartoon buff, and once he took a look at my resume and noticed Daws Butler's name on it, we were off and running, sharing anecdotes about Daws and animation. After about twenty minutes, he said, 'considering your background, I don't see how I could cast anyone but you in this part! It was her first role in a feature film. The segment was based on The Twilight Zone television series episode "It's a Good Life", which was later parodied in The Simpsons episode "Treehouse of Horror II" (1991).

Cartwright continued to do voice work for projects including Pound Puppies, Popeye and Son, Snorks, My Little Pony and Saturday Supercade. She joined a "loop group", and recorded vocals for characters in the background of films, although in most cases the sound was turned down so that very little of her voice was heard. She did minor voice-over work for several films, including The Clan of the Cave Bear (1986), Silverado (1985), Sixteen Candles (1984), Back to the Future Part II , and The Color Purple (1985). Cartwright also voiced a shoe that was "dipped" in acid in Who Framed Roger Rabbit (1988), describing it as her first "off-screen death scene", and worked to correctly convey the emotion involved.

In 1985, she auditioned for a guest spot as Cynthia in Cheers. The audition called for her to say her line and walk off the set. Cartwright decided to take a chance on being different and continued walking, leaving the building and returning home. The production crew was confused, but she received the part. In search of more training as an actress, Cartwright joined a class taught by Hollywood coach Milton Katselas. He recommended that Cartwright study La Strada, a 1956 Italian film starring Giulietta Masina and directed by Federico Fellini. She began performing "every imaginable scene" from La Strada in her class and spent several months trying to secure the rights to produce a stage adaptation. She visited Italy with the intention of meeting Fellini and requesting his permission in person. Although they never met, Cartwright kept a journal of the trip and later wrote a one-woman play called In Search of Fellini, partially based on her voyage. The play was co-written by Peter Kjenaas, and Cartwright won a Drama-Logue Award after performing it in Los Angeles in 1995. In a 1998 interview, she stated her intention to make it into a feature film, which she succeeded in doing in 2017.

The Simpsons

Cartwright voices the character Bart Simpson on the long-running animated television show The Simpsons. On March 13, 1987, she auditioned for a series of animated shorts about a dysfunctional family that was to appear on The Tracey Ullman Show, a sketch comedy program. Cartwright had intended to audition for the role of Lisa Simpson, the elder daughter. After arriving at the audition, she found that Lisa was simply described as the middle child and at the time did not have much personality. Cartwright became more interested in the role of Bart, described as "devious, underachieving, school-hating, irreverent, [and] clever". Creator Matt Groening let her try out for Bart and gave her the job on the spot. Bart's voice came naturally to Cartwright, as she had previously used elements of it in My Little Pony, Snorks, and Pound Puppies. Cartwright describes Bart's voice as easy to perform compared with other characters. The recording of the shorts was often primitive; the dialog was recorded on a portable tape deck in a makeshift studio above the bleachers on the set of The Tracey Ullman Show. Cartwright, the only cast member to have been professionally trained in voice acting, described the sessions as "great fun". However, she wanted to appear in the live-action sketches and occasionally showed up for recording sessions early, hoping to be noticed by a producer.

In 1989, the shorts were spun off into a half-hour show on the Fox network called The Simpsons. Bart quickly became the show's breakout personality and one of the most celebrated characters on television—his popularity in 1990 and 1991 was known as "Bartmania". Bart was described as "television's brightest new star" by Mike Boone of The Gazette and was named 1990's "entertainer of the year" by Entertainment Weekly. Despite Bart's fame, however, Cartwright remained relatively unknown. During the first season of The Simpsons, Fox ordered Cartwright not to give interviews, because they did not want to publicize the fact that Bart was voiced by a woman. Cartwright's normal speaking voice is said to have "no obvious traces of Bart", and she believes her role is "the best acting job in the world" since she is rarely recognized in public. When she is recognized and asked to perform Bart's voice in front of children, Cartwright refuses because it "freaks [them] out". Bart's catchphrase "Eat My Shorts" was an ad-lib by Cartwright in one of the original table readings, referring to an incident from her high school days. Once while performing, members of the Fairmont West High School marching band switched their chant from the usual "Fairmont West! Fairmont West!" to the irreverent "Eat my shorts!" Cartwright felt it appropriate for Bart, and improvised the line; it became a popular catchphrase on the show.

Cartwright voices several other characters on the show, including Nelson Muntz, Ralph Wiggum, Todd Flanders, Kearney, and Database. She first voiced Nelson in the episode "Bart the General" (season one, 1990). The character was to be voiced by Dana Hill, but Hill missed the recording session and Cartwright was given the role. She developed Nelson's voice on the spot and describes him as "a throat-ripper". Ralph Wiggum had originally been voiced by Jo Ann Harris, but Cartwright was assigned to voice the character in "Bart the Murderer" (season three, 1991). Todd Flanders, the only voice for which Cartwright used another source, is based on Sherman (voiced by Walter Tetley), the boy from Peabody's Improbable History, a series of shorts aired on The Rocky and Bullwinkle Show.

Cartwright received a Primetime Emmy Award for Outstanding Voice-Over Performance in 1992 for her performance as Bart in the episode "Separate Vocations" and an Annie Award in 1995 for Best Voice Acting in the Field of Animation. Bart was named one of the 100 most important people of the 20th century by Time, and in 2000, Bart and the rest of the Simpson family were awarded a star on the Hollywood Walk of Fame, located at 7021 Hollywood Boulevard.

Until 1998, Cartwright was paid $30,000 per episode. During a pay dispute in 1998, Fox threatened to replace the six main voice actors and made preparations for casting new actors. The dispute was resolved, however, and Cartwright received $125,000 per episode until 2004, when the voice actors demanded $360,000 an episode. A compromise was reached after a month, and Cartwright's pay rose to $250,000 per episode. Salaries were re-negotiated in 2008 with the voice actors receiving approximately $400,000 per episode. Three years later, with Fox threatening to cancel the series unless production costs were cut, Cartwright and the other cast members accepted a 25 percent pay cut, down to just over $300,000 per episode.

Further career

In addition to her work on The Simpsons, Cartwright has voiced many other characters on several animated series, including Chuckie Finster in Rugrats and All Grown Up!, Margo Sherman in The Critic, Mindy in Animaniacs, and Rufus the naked mole-rat in Kim Possible. For the role of Rufus, Cartwright researched mole-rats extensively, and became "a font of useless trivia". She was nominated for a Daytime Emmy Award for Outstanding Performer in an Animated Program in 2004 for her work on the show. In 2001, Cartwright took over the Rugrats role of Chuckie Finster when Christine Cavanaugh retired. Cartwright describes Rufus and Chuckie as her two most difficult voices: "Rufus because my diaphragm gets a workout while trying to utilize the 18 vocal sounds a mole makes. Chuckie because ... he's an asthmatic with five personalities rolled into one—plus I have to do the voice the way [Cavanaugh] did it for 10 years." Other television shows that have used her voice work include Galaxy High, God, the Devil and Bob, Goof Troop, Mike, Lu & Og, The Replacements, Pinky and the Brain and Timberwolf. Cartwright has appeared on camera in numerous television shows and films, including Fame, Empty Nest, The Fresh Prince of Bel-Air, Flesh and Blood, Godzilla, and 24.

In 2000, Cartwright published her autobiography, My Life as a 10-Year-Old Boy. The book details her career (particularly her experiences as the voice of Bart) and contains stories about life behind the scenes of The Simpsons. Laura A. Bischoff of the Dayton Daily News commented that the book was the "ultimate insider's guide to The Simpsons". Critics complained that the book lacked interesting stories and was aimed mostly at fans of The Simpsons rather than a general audience.

Cartwright adapted My Life as a 10-Year-Old Boy into a one-woman play in 2004. Cartwright has performed it at a variety of venues, including the August 2004 Edinburgh Festival Fringe in Scotland. The play received modest reviews, including criticism for a lack of inside stories about The Simpsons, and its "overweeningly upbeat" tone. David Chatterton of The British Theatre Guide described the show as "interesting and entertaining, but not really a 'must see' even for Simpsons fans".

Cartwright has shown an interest in stock car racing and as of 2007 was seeking a NASCAR license. In 2001, she founded a production company called SportsBlast and created an online animated series called The Kellys. The series is focused on racing; Cartwright voices a seven-year-old named Chip Kelly.

In 2016, Cartwright launched Spotted Cow Entertainment, her own film and television production company, with Peter Kjenaas, Monica Gil and Kevin Burke. With a focus on international audiences, Spotted Cow is seeking "to finance, produce and acquire live action and animated films, television series, as well as entertainment for digital platforms with budgets up to $15M." With Spotted Cow, Cartwright made her first film as a screenwriter and producer, In Search of Fellini, which was released on September 15, 2017. Based on her own journey to Italy in 1985 in a bid to meet the famed director Federico Fellini, the film fulfilled Cartwright's longtime vision of turning her 1995 one-woman play In Search of Fellini into a movie.

Personal life
Cartwright met Warren Murphy, 24 years her senior, on her birthday in 1988 and married him two months later. In her book, she describes Murphy as her "personal laugh track". The couple had two children, Lucy and Jack, before divorcing in 2002.

Cartwright was raised a Roman Catholic but joined the Church of Scientology in 1991.  She was awarded Scientology's Patron Laureate Award after donating $10,000,000, almost twice her annual salary, to the Church in 2007.

Cartwright is a contributor to ASIFA-Hollywood's Animation Archive Project. In September 2007, Cartwright received the Make-a-Wish Foundation's Wish Icon Award "for her tremendous dedication to the Foundation's fundraising and wish-fulfillment efforts." In 2005, Cartwright created a scholarship at Fairmont High School "designed to aid Fairmont [graduates] who dream of following in her footsteps and studying speech, debate, drama or music" at Ohio University. In 2005, Cartwright was given the title of Honorary Mayor of Northridge, California (a neighborhood of Los Angeles) by the Northridge Chamber of Commerce.

In 2007, Cartwright was in a romantic relationship with contractor Stephen Brackett, a fellow member of Scientology. In early 2008, the couple had made plans to marry, but Brackett died in May 2009, after he "apparently leaped" off the Bixby Creek Bridge in Big Sur, California.

In 2012, Cartwright received an honorary doctorate degree in communication from Ohio University, where she was a student from 1976 to 1977 before transferring to UCLA.

Cartwright is also a painter, sculptor and philanthropist. She co-founded the Know More About Drugs alliance.

Filmography

Live-action

Film

Television

Voice roles

Film

Animation

Video games

Music videos

Theme parks

Web series

Producer

Other credits

Awards

References

Bibliography

External links

 
 
 
 

1957 births
Living people
Actresses from Dayton, Ohio
Actresses from Los Angeles
American film actresses
American memoirists
American Scientologists
American stage actresses
American television actresses
American video game actresses
American voice actresses
American women comedians
American women memoirists
Annie Award winners
Converts to Scientology from Roman Catholicism
Hanna-Barbera people
Ohio University alumni
People from Kettering, Ohio
People from Westwood, Los Angeles
Primetime Emmy Award winners
UCLA Film School alumni
20th-century American actresses
21st-century American actresses